In sports, offense (American spelling) or offence (Commonwealth spelling, see spelling differences; pronounced with first-syllable stress; from Latin offensus), known as attack outside of North America, is the action of attacking or engaging an opposing team with the objective of scoring points or goals. The term may refer to the tactics involved in offense, or a sub-team whose primary responsibility is offense.

Generally, goals are scored by teams' offenses, but in sports such as American football it is common to see defenses and special teams (which serve as a team's offensive unit on kicking plays and defensive on returning plays) score as well. The fielding side in cricket is also generally known as the bowling attack despite the batting side being the side that scores runs, because they can prevent batting players from scoring by getting them out, and end the batting team's scoring turn by getting them all out.

In countries outside North America, the term offence is almost always taken to mean an infraction of the rules, a penalty or foul, and attack is more likely to be used where Americans would use offense.

See also
 Defence (sports)
 Goalkeeper 

 

Terminology used in multiple sports